The 2020–21 Scottish League Cup Group stage took place from 6 October 2020 to 15 November 2020. A total of 40 teams competed in the group stage. The winners of each of the eight groups, as well as the four best runners-up progressed to the second round (last 16) of the 2020–21 Scottish League Cup.

Format
The group stage consisted of eight groups of five teams. The four clubs competing in the UEFA Champions League (Celtic) and Europa League (Rangers, Motherwell, and Aberdeen) qualifying rounds were given a bye through to the second round. The 40 teams taking part in the group stage consisted of the other eight teams that competed in the 2019–20 Scottish Premiership, and all of the teams that competed in the 2019–20 Scottish Championship, 2019–20 Scottish League One and 2019–20 Scottish League Two, as well as the 2019–20 Highland Football League and the 2019–20 Lowland Football League champions.

The winners of each of the eight groups, as well as the four best runners-up, progressed to the second round (last 16), which included the four UEFA qualifying clubs. At this stage, the competition reverted to the traditional knock-out format. The four group winners with the highest points total and the clubs entering at this stage were seeded, with the four group winners with the lowest points unseeded along with the four best runners-up.

The traditional point system of awarding three points for a win and one point for a draw was used, however, for each group stage match that finished in a draw, a penalty shoot-out took place, with the winner being awarded a bonus point.

The draw for the group stage took place on 10 August 2020 and was broadcast live on FreeSports & the SPFL YouTube channel.

Teams

North

Seeding
Teams in Bold qualified for the second round.

Source:

South

Seeding

Source:

North

Group A

Matches

Group B

Matches

Notes

Group C

Matches

Group D

Matches

South

Group E

Matches

Notes

Group F

Matches

Notes

Group G

Matches

Group H

Matches

Best runners-up

Qualified teams

Top goalscorers

Source:

References

External links
 Scottish Professional Football League – League Cup official website

Scottish League Cup group stages